Luke David Maye (born March 7, 1997) is an American professional basketball player for Covirán Granada of the Spanish Liga Endesa. He played college basketball for the North Carolina Tar Heels.

Early life
Maye was born in Cary, North Carolina, the son of Amie and Mark Maye, a former quarterback for the University of North Carolina at Chapel Hill Maye played high school basketball at William A. Hough High School in Cornelius, North Carolina where he made the Associated Press' All-State team twice. Maye also played high school baseball for four years.

College career

Freshman season (2015–16)
Maye committed to the University of North Carolina without knowing if he would receive a scholarship. Before he enrolled, he was informed by head coach Roy Williams that he would be on full scholarship. He was seldom used as a freshman.

Sophomore season (2016–17)
In Maye's sophomore season, he recorded his first 10-point game coming off the bench against Davidson in December. Despite only having three 10-point games during the regular season, Maye had three more 10-point games during the NCAA Tournament. In the Elite Eight game against Kentucky, Maye hit the game-winning jump shot with 0.3 seconds left in the game, shortly after Malik Monk hit a three to tie the game at 73 with 7.2 seconds left. He also had a then career-high 17 points in this game. For his performance in the South Regional, he was named to the South Regional all-tournament team and won the regional's Most Outstanding Player award. In addition, a clip of him attending his 8:00 am class the following day would end up going viral. North Carolina went on to beat Oregon and Gonzaga to win the 2017 NCAA Men's Basketball National Championship. He finished the season averaging 5.5 points per game.

Junior season (2017–18)
Maye had a breakout season as a junior in the 2017–18 season. In his first nine games, he averaged 20.8 points and 10.3 rebounds per game. This was the best start by a Tar Heel since Tyler Hansbrough's senior year in 2008-09. He ended up averaging 16.9 points per game and leading the team with 10.1 rebounds per game. On April 23, 2018, Maye declared for the NBA draft without hiring an agent. On May 24, Maye announced his intention to return to UNC for his senior season.

Senior season (2018–19)
Coming into the season Maye was nominated for many preseason awards including preseason ACC player of the year. On February 5, Maye tallied 31 points and 12 rebounds in a 113-96 win against NC State. On February 21, Maye scored 30 points and 15 rebounds in a 88-72 victory over rival Duke. He averaged 14.9 points and 10.5 rebounds per game as a senior.

Professional career
On June 21, 2019, the Milwaukee Bucks signed Maye to their Summer League team. On October 14, 2019, Luke Maye was waived by the Bucks, but was assigned to the Bucks' NBA G League affiliate, the Wisconsin Herd. Maye was sidelined with an injury from December 16, 2019 to January 14, 2020. On March 7, Maye posted 25 points, nine rebounds, two assists, one block and one steal in a 136-122 win over the Capital City Go-Go. He signed with Dolomiti Energia Trento of the Italian Lega Basket Serie A on July 18, 2020. Maye averaged 11.6 points, 6 rebounds, and 1.3 assists per game. On July 23, 2021, he signed a two-year deal with Baxi Manresa of the Liga ACB.

On July 31, 2022, he has signed with Covirán Granada of the Spanish LEB Oro.

Career statistics

College

|-
| style="text-align:left;"|2015–16
| style="text-align:left;"|North Carolina
| 33 || 0 || 5.4 || .390 || .286 || .429 || 1.7 || .2 || .1 || .1 || 1.2
|-
| style="text-align:left;"|2016–17
| style="text-align:left;"|North Carolina
| 35 || 1 || 14.1 || .479 || .400 || .579 || 3.9 || 1.2 || .4 || .2 || 5.5
|-
| style="text-align:left;"|2017–18
| style="text-align:left;"|North Carolina
| 37 || 37 || 32.2 || .486 || .431 || .624 || 10.1 || 2.4 || 1.0 || 1.0 || 16.9
|-
| style="text-align:left;"|2018–19
| style="text-align:left;"|North Carolina
| 36 || 36 || 30.9 || .430 || .288 || .774 || 10.4 || 2.3 || .6 || .6 || 14.9
|- class="sortbottom"
| style="text-align:center;" colspan="2"|Career
| 141 || 74 || 21.1 || .460 || .361 || .675 || 6.7 || 1.6 || .5 || .5 || 9.9

Professional Career Statistics

|-
| align=center | 2019-20
| align=left | Wisconsin Herd 
| NBA G-League
| 34 || 23.1 || .426 || .354 || .921 || 7.4 || 1.8 || .6 || .5 || 10.7
|-
| align=center | 2020-21
| align=left | Dolomiti Energia Trento 
| LBA
| 41 || 25.2 || .419 || .348 || .805 || 6 || 1.2 || .5 || .4 || 11.6
|-
| align=center | 2021-22
| align=left | Bàsquet Manresa 
| ACB
| 51 || 17.3 || .407 || .341 || .789 || 3.8 || .6 || .4 || .3 || 8.9
|-

Personal life
Maye has three younger brothers, Cole, Drake and Beau. Cole Maye won a national championship as a pitcher for the University of Florida, Drake is the current starting quarterbackfor UNC, and Beau is also a walk-on of the varsity basketball team at Carolina.

Maye grew up as close family friends with NFL Pittsburgh Steelers quarterback Mason Rudolph. Their fathers played collegiately together at North Carolina.

References

External links
North Carolina Tar Heels bio

1997 births
Living people
All-American college men's basketball players
American expatriate basketball people in Italy
American expatriate basketball people in Spain
American men's basketball players
Aquila Basket Trento players
Basketball players from North Carolina
Bàsquet Manresa players
Fundación CB Granada players
Lega Basket Serie A players
Liga ACB players
North Carolina Tar Heels men's basketball players
People from Cary, North Carolina
Power forwards (basketball)
Wisconsin Herd players